Henry Moses Wood (1788–28 September 1867) was an architect based in Nottingham.

Career
He studied in the practice of Edward Staveley, and continued the business after Staveley's death in 1837. One of his pupils, William Booker established himself as an architect and surveyor in Nottingham.

In 1831, jointly with Edward Staveley, he produced a detailed plan and map of Nottingham and its suburbs.

In 1835-1836 he was Sheriff of Nottingham.

He was manager of the Nottinghamshire and Derbyshire Fire and Life Assurance Company. His son succeeded him in this business.

In 1811, he married a Miss Wilson of Shelford Manor and they had 11 children.

He died in Buxton, Derbyshire on 28 September 1867. His son, Henry Walter Wood, continued his practice in Nottingham after his death. His other son, Arthur Augustus Wood, was a playwright.

Buildings and work

References

19th-century English architects
1788 births
1867 deaths
Sheriffs of Nottingham
Architects from Nottingham